Igor Aleksandrovich Kazmin (born 8 September 1965) is a former Russian football player.

References

1965 births
Living people
Soviet footballers
FC FShM Torpedo Moscow players
PFC CSKA Moscow players
FC Asmaral Moscow players
FC Dnepr Mogilev players
Russian footballers
FC Shinnik Yaroslavl players
Russian Premier League players
Association football defenders
FC Lokomotiv Moscow players
FC Spartak Moscow players